The 1987 UK Athletics Championships was the national championship in outdoor track and field for the United Kingdom held at Moorways Stadium, Derby. It was the first time that the English city hosted the event. The men's 10,000 metres was held at the Gateshead International Stadium, while the women's event was dropped entirely.

It was the eleventh edition of the competition limited to British athletes only, launched as an alternative to the AAA Championships, which was open to foreign competitors. However, due to the fact that the calibre of national competition remained greater at the AAA event, the UK Championships this year were not considered the principal national championship event by some statisticians, such as the National Union of Track Statisticians (NUTS). Many of the athletes below also competed at the 1987 AAA Championships.

Fatima Whitbread won her seventh consecutive women's javelin throw UK title, while shot putter Judy Oakes won a fourth straight title and men's javelin athlete Mick Hill his third. Other athletes to defend their 1986 titles were Max Robertson (400 m hurdles), Paula Dunn (100 m), Lisa Langford (racewalk) and Diana Davies (high jump). Dunn, with her sprint double, was the only athlete to win two UK titles that year, though Kim Hagger managed to be runner-up in both 100 m hurdles and long jump events.

The main international track and field competition for the United Kingdom that year was the 1987 World Championships in Athletics. Women's UK champion Fatima Whitbread won the world title, as she had in 1983. Men's 100 m champion Linford Christie was the only other UK champion to reach the podium, though several British athletes not present at the UK event did so.

Medal summary

Men

Women

References

UK Athletics Championships
UK Outdoor Championships
Athletics Outdoor
Sport in Derby
Athletics competitions in England
1980s in Derby